

Eberhard von Kurowski (10 September 1895 – 11 September 1957) was a German general (Generalleutnant) in the Wehrmacht during World War II. He was a recipient of the Knight's Cross of the Iron Cross.

Kurowski surrendered to the Red Army in the course of the Soviet 1944 Vitebsk–Orsha Offensive. Convicted as a war criminal in the Soviet Union, he was held until 1955.

Awards and decorations

 Knight's Cross of the Iron Cross on 23 January 1942 as Oberst i.G. and Chief of Generalstab XXXX. Armeekorps

References

Citations

Bibliography

 
 

1895 births
1957 deaths
Military personnel from Szczecin
People from the Province of Pomerania
Lieutenant generals of the German Army (Wehrmacht)
German Army personnel of World War I
Prussian Army personnel
Recipients of the Knight's Cross of the Iron Cross
German prisoners of war in World War II held by the Soviet Union
Recipients of the clasp to the Iron Cross, 1st class
German Army generals of World War II